Rumuruti is a town in Laikipia County in Kenya's former Rift Valley Province. It is approximately 40 kilometers due north from Nyahururu, on the Nyahururu-Maralal road (A4). Despite being smaller than either Nanyuki or Nyahururu, which are on the Southeastern and Southwestern corners of Laikipia respectively, its central location meant that it was selected as the administrative headquarters of the new County government in 2013. In 2013 a local business launched a plan to build a 200 million Kenya shilling meat processing facility in the town.

Scenes from the Hollywood film King Solomon's Mines were shot in the town. .

Economy
The town's residents are livestock keepers, with approximately 500 cattle and 1,200 sheep and goats are sold at the town's weekly livestock auction.

References 

Populated places in Laikipia County
County capitals in Kenya